Mircea Popescu from the Motor Design Ltd, Ellesmere, UK was named Fellow of the Institute of Electrical and Electronics Engineers (IEEE) in 2015 for contributions to AC induction and permanent magnet electric machines.

References 

Fellow Members of the IEEE
Living people
Year of birth missing (living people)
Place of birth missing (living people)